Moscoso is a Galician surname most prominently held in the Andean nations of Peru, Ecuador, Bolivia and Colombia.  It is also common in Guatemala and Chile.  Within Spain, the surname is most common in Andalusia, having arrived there with Galicians during the reconquest.  Etymologically, this surname comes from Latin muscōsum, accusative singular of muscōsus, meaning mossy...Alternatively, from mosca (“fly”) + -oso (“place with”). However, there are few, if any examples, in which Latin word-final "a" becomes "o", making this latter etymology unlikely."

People with the name
 Javier Moscoso del Prado y Muñoz (born 1934), a Spanish politician
 Juan de Moscoso (d. 1663), Chilean Jesuit missionary
 Juan Manuel Moscoso y Peralta ( 1723-1811), a Bishop of Córdoba and Cusco; and Archbishop of Granada (Spain)
 Juan Pío Camilo de Tristán y Moscoso (1773–1860), a Peruvian general and politician
 Guillermo Moscoso (born 1983), current MLB baseball pitcher
 Gustavo Moscoso (born 1955), Chilean soccer player
 Hugo González Moscoso (1922-2010), one of the leaders of Revolutionary Workers' Party in Bolivia
 Juan Carlos Moscoso (born 1982), Salvadorean soccer player
 Luis de Moscoso Alvarado (1505–1551), Spanish explorer
 Luis Moscoso (born 1950), Washington State Representative
 Mireya Moscoso (born 1946), former President of Panama
 Piedad Moscoso (1932–2010), Ecuadorian educator, physician, and activist
 Teodoro Moscoso (1910–1992), Puerto Rican politician
 Victor Moscoso (born 1936), American illustrator and comic book artist

Businesses
Farmacias Moscoso, a Puerto Rican former pharmacy chain

Other uses
Moscoso, in Spain is informal name of a "day of private affairs" - a day of unpaid leave for certain groups of workers and officials. Named after the minister Javier Moscoso, who signed this right for civil servants.

References

Galician-language surnames
Spanish-language surnames